Novak Djokovic defeated Roger Federer in the final, 6–7(7–9), 6–4, 7–6(7–4), 5–7, 6–4 to win the gentlemen's singles tennis title at the 2014 Wimbledon Championships. It was his second Wimbledon title and seventh major title overall.

Andy Murray was the defending champion, but lost to Grigor Dimitrov in the quarterfinals.

19-year-old Nick Kyrgios became the first man to reach the Wimbledon quarterfinals on debut since Florian Mayer in 2004. Defeating the world No. 1, Rafael Nadal, in the fourth round, Kyrgios also became the lowest-ranked player to defeat the world No. 1 at a major since 1992 (when Andrei Olhovskiy defeated Jim Courier in the third round of Wimbledon) and the first wildcard to reach a major quarterfinal since Goran Ivanišević in 2001.

Although Nadal was world No. 1 entering the tournament, he was seeded second behind Djokovic due to his recent poor performances on grass (and notably his early exits at Wimbledon the previous two years). By claiming the title, Djokovic replaced Nadal as the world No. 1. The final marked the first major men's singles final since the 2009 US Open to feature neither Murray nor Nadal.

Seeds

  Novak Djokovic (champion)
  Rafael Nadal (fourth round)
  Andy Murray (quarterfinals)
  Roger Federer (final)
  Stan Wawrinka (quarterfinals)
  Tomáš Berdych (third round)
  David Ferrer (second round)
  Milos Raonic (semifinals)
  John Isner (third round)
  Kei Nishikori (fourth round)
  Grigor Dimitrov (semifinals)
  Ernests Gulbis (second round)
  Richard Gasquet (second round)
  Jo-Wilfried Tsonga (fourth round)
  Jerzy Janowicz (third round)
  Fabio Fognini (third round)
  Mikhail Youzhny (second round)
  Fernando Verdasco (first round)
  Feliciano López (fourth round)
  Kevin Anderson (fourth round)
  Alexandr Dolgopolov (third round)
  Philipp Kohlschreiber (second round)
  Tommy Robredo (fourth round)
  Gaël Monfils (second round)
  Andreas Seppi (first round)
  Marin Čilić (quarterfinals)
  Roberto Bautista Agut (third round)
  Guillermo García-López (first round)
  Ivo Karlović (first round)
  Marcel Granollers (second round)
  Vasek Pospisil (first round)
  Dmitry Tursunov (first round)

Qualifying

Draw

Finals

Top half

Section 1

Section 2

Section 3

Section 4

Bottom half

Section 5

Section 6

Section 7

Section 8

References

External links

 2014 Wimbledon Championships – Men's draws and results at the International Tennis Federation

Men's Singles
Wimbledon Championship by year – Men's singles